Baoquan (宝泉) could refer to the following locations in China:

Baoquan, Kedong County (宝泉镇), town in Heilongjiang
Baoquan Township (宝泉乡), Gongzhuling, Jilin